Marcelo Arévalo and Jean-Julien Rojer defeated Lloyd Glasspool and Harri Heliövaara in the final, 6–3, 6–3 to win the doubles tennis title at the 2022 Stockholm Open.

Santiago González and Andrés Molteni were the defending champions, but lost in the semifinals to Arévalo and Rojer.

Seeds

Draw

Draw

References
Main draw

Stockholm Open - Doubles
Doubles